Noah Richler is a Canadian author, journalist, and broadcaster who was raised in Montreal, Quebec, Canada and London, England. He is the son of Canadian novelist Mordecai Richler.

Richler worked for many years as a radio documentary producer for BBC Radio, representing the organization at the Prix Futura and winning a Sony Award before following in his father's footsteps and becoming a writer. After returning to Canada in 1998, he was the books editor and then the literary columnist for the National Post. His book This Is My Country, What's Yours? A Literary Atlas of Canada won the 2007 British Columbia's National Award for Canadian Non-Fiction. The book is a literary travelogue and cultural portrait of the country, for which he interviewed novelists and storytellers from Newfoundland to British Columbia and the Inuit Arctic. He also produced and presented a ten-part series for the CBC Radio program Ideas based on his research.

He has contributed to numerous publications in Britain, including The Guardian, Punch and The Daily Telegraph, and in Canada, The Walrus, Maisonneuve, Saturday Night, the Toronto Star, and The Globe and Mail.

He lives in Toronto with his wife, House of Anansi Press publisher Sarah MacLachlan. Richler stood as a candidate for the New Democratic Party in the electoral district of Toronto—St. Paul's in the 2015 federal election. He came third as Carolyn Bennett, St. Paul's' long-serving Liberal Member of Parliament, was re-elected. In 2016 he published The Candidate: Fear and Loathing on the Campaign Trail, a memoir of his experience on the campaign trail. The book was a shortlisted finalist for the 2016 Shaughnessy Cohen Prize for Political Writing.

References

External links
 Noah Richler profile at Penguin Random House Canada's website

Canadian memoirists
British radio producers
Canadian radio producers
Canadian newspaper journalists
Canadian male journalists
Living people
Writers from Montreal
New Democratic Party candidates for the Canadian House of Commons
Ontario candidates for Member of Parliament
Noah
Canadian male non-fiction writers
Canadian political writers
21st-century Canadian non-fiction writers
Year of birth missing (living people)
21st-century memoirists
Jewish Canadian journalists
Candidates in the 2015 Canadian federal election